The 2005 Houston elections took place on November 8, 2005, with runoffs taking place on December 10, 2005. All City Council posts, the City Controller, and the Mayor all had elections. All positions were non-partisan.

Mayor
See 2005 Houston mayoral election

City Controller

The 2005 Houston City Controller election was a non disputed election with Incumbent Annise Parker being re-elected to a second term with 100% of the vote.

City Council At-large 1

In the 2005 Houston City Council At-large 1 election, Peter Hoyt Brown was elected to his first term without a runoff. Brown replaced Council Member Mark Ellis, who was term-limited.

City Council At-large 2

In the 2005 Houston City Council At-large 2 election, Sue Lovell was elected.

City Council At-large 3

City Council At-large 4

City Council At-large 5

City Council District A

City Council District B

City Council District C

City Council District D

City Council District E

City Council District F

City Council District G

City Council District H

City Council District I

References

2005 in Houston
Houston
Elections 2005
Non-partisan elections